Avi Peretz (born September 2, 1971) is an Israeli former football player who last worked as a goalkeeping coach in Hapoel Haifa. In June 2020, he became the chairman of the Israel Tennis Association.

Career
Avi Peretz was born in Beersheba, a city in the middle part of Israel.

Avi Peretz began playing at the youth team of Hapoel Be'er Sheva in the 80's. Later he moved on to Hapoel Arad and then to Maccabi Jaffa. In 1991, he played for Maccabi Yavne and two years later he moved to Hapoel Bat Yam, where he played for two years. At the end of the year he moved to Hapoel Ashkelon and one year later he moved to Hapoel Be'er Sheva.

In 1997, he moved to Hapoel Haifa and in 1999 he moved to Maccabi Haifa. In 2001, he moved back to Hapoel Haifa and in 2003 he moved to Beitar Jerusalem.

In July 2004 he moved to Maccabi Netanya and helped them get promoted to the Israeli Premier League. After two successful seasons in Netanya he moved back to Hapoel Ashkelon and a year after that he signed a one-year contract with Hapoel Petah Tikva.

He played in Hapoel Bnei Lod until July 2009 when he retired from playing after 19 years.

He worked as a goalkeeper coach, having worked for Hapoel Haifa, Maccabi Netanya and Maccabi Haifa.

Since 2015 he is one of the partners of Golden Tennis Netanya.
In 2020, he was elected as a president of the (ITA) Israeli Tennis Association for a four-year term

Honours
Winner:
Israeli Premier League (2):
1998-99, 2000–01
State Cup (1):
1997
Toto Cup (Leumit) (2):
2004-05, 2007–08

Runner-up:
State Cup (1):
2007
Liga Leumit (2):
2004-05, 2007–08

References

External links

Profile at One

1971 births
Living people
Israeli Jews
Israeli footballers
Association football goalkeepers
Hapoel Be'er Sheva F.C. players
Hapoel Petah Tikva F.C. players
Maccabi Jaffa F.C. players
Maccabi Yavne F.C. players
Hapoel Ashkelon F.C. players
Maccabi Haifa F.C. players
Beitar Jerusalem F.C. players
Hapoel Haifa F.C. players
Maccabi Netanya F.C. players
Hapoel Bnei Lod F.C. players
Liga Leumit players
Israeli Premier League players
Footballers from Bat Yam